Frederikus Johannes Maria Goduwes "Frits" Schür (born 22 July 1950) is a retired Dutch cyclist who was active between 1970 and 1984. He competed at the 1976 Summer Olympics in the individual road race, but failed to finish. He won the Olympia's Tour in 1970 and 1972 and Tour of Algeria in 1972, as well as a silver medal in the team time trial at the 1971 UCI Road World Championships.

See also
 List of Dutch Olympic cyclists

References

1950 births
Living people
Olympic cyclists of the Netherlands
Cyclists at the 1976 Summer Olympics
Dutch male cyclists
People from Tynaarlo
UCI Road World Championships cyclists for the Netherlands
Cyclists from Drenthe